"Beaver Patrol" is a single released by the band Pop Will Eat Itself in 1987. It appears on the album Box Frenzy in a slightly edited version. The song was originally recorded by the sixties band The Wilde Knights.

Beaver Patrol is the point where Pop Will Eat Itself's musical style drastically changed with the loss of live drums due to Graham converting to lead vocals. Beaver Patrol is far more electronic than anything previously released by the band, with a drum machine replacing the live drumkit and the prominent use of various vocal samples. This new style would persist for the next six years, until the introduction of a new live drummer, Fuzz Townshend.

The b-side of the 7" version, Bubbles – as well as the other b-sides found on the 12" version – still retains the guitar-driven, live drumming grebo style of PWEI's early releases. All three of these tracks are also on the compilation Now For A Feast!.

The music video recorded for the song features the band performing on stage with a manikin.

Track listing

7" Version
Side One
 "Beaver Patrol (12" Version)" 3:35
Side Two
 "Bubbles" 3:07

12" Version
Side One
 "Beaver Patrol (12" Version)" 3:35
Side Two
 "Bubbles" 3:07
 "Oh Grebo, I Think I Love You (New Version)" 1:53
 "Ugly" 1:34

References
 http://www.popwilleatitself.co.uk/beaver-patrol/#.VO586zGUeSo
 http://pweination.com/pwei/

1987 songs
Pop Will Eat Itself songs